The 1994 Davis Cup (also known as the 1994 Davis Cup by NEC for sponsorship purposes) was the 83rd edition of the Davis Cup, the most important tournament between national teams in men's tennis. 109 teams would enter the competition, 16 in the World Group, 22 in the Americas Zone, 23 in the Asia/Oceania Zone, and 39 in the Europe/Africa Zone. Belarus, Brunei, Georgia, Lithuania, Oman, Slovakia, Sudan and Uzbekistan made their first appearances in the tournament.

Sweden defeated Russia in the final, held at the Olympic Stadium in Moscow, Russia, on 2–4 December, to win their 5th title overall.

World Group

Draw

Final
Russia vs. Sweden

World Group Qualifying Round

Date: 23–25 September

The eight losing teams in the World Group first round ties and eight winners of the Zonal Group I final round ties competed in the World Group Qualifying Round for spots in the 1995 World Group.

Americas Zone

Group I

Group II

Group III
 Venue: St. Lucia Racquet Club, Gros Islet, Saint Lucia
 Date: 9–13 March

Final standings

  and  promoted to Group II in 1995.

Asia/Oceania Zone

Group I

Group II

Group III
 Venue: Khalifa International Tennis and Squash Complex, Doha, Qatar
 Date: 6–10 April

Group A

Group B

  and  promoted to Group II in 1995.

Europe/Africa Zone

Group I

Group II

Group III

Zone A
 Venue: Hôtel Ivoire, Abidjan, Ivory Coast
 Date: 4–8 May

Group A

Group B

Zone B
 Venue: SSI Slovan Tennis Club, Bratislava, Slovakia
 Date: 18–22 May

Final standings

References
General

Specific

External links
Davis Cup Official Website

 
Davis Cups by year
Davis Cup
Davis Cup